Oumar Diouck (born 9 November 1994) is a Belgian professional footballer who plays as a forward for Icelandic club Njarðvík FC.

Club career

Beerschot
Diouck began his professional career with Belgian Pro League side Beerschot, but never made a competitive appearance for the club.

Antwerp
In 2011, Diouck signed with Belgian Second Division side Royal Antwerp. On 10 September 2011, he made his professional debut for Antwerp as a substitute in a league match against Sint-Niklaas. On 13 October 2012, he scored his first professional goal in a 3–2 win over Tubize.

Helmond Sport
In 2014, Diouck signed with Dutch Eerste Divisie side Helmond Sport. He went on to score 10 goals in 31 appearances in all competitions in the 2014–15 season.

Lommel United
In June 2015, Diouck signed with Belgian Second Division side Lommel United.

Tienen
In January 2017, Diouck trialled with Dutch Eerste Divisie club Achilles '29.

He later signed with Belgian Second Amateur Division side K.V.K. Tienen-Hageland for the 2017-18 season.

FC Edmonton
On 31 January 2019, Diouck signed with Canadian Premier League club FC Edmonton. Diouck scored 6 goals in for Edmonton in the 2019 Canadian Premier League season, as well as one in the Canadian Championship, good for the second most goals on the team, after Easton Ongaro. Edmonton finished the spring season in third place, but dropped to sixth in the fall season. After the 2019 season ended, Diouck announced on Twitter that he would not return to Edmonton for the 2020 season.

KF
On 24 June 2020, Diouck signed with Icelandic 2. deild karla side Knattspyrnufélag Fjallabyggðar. He made his debut on 27 June as a substitute in a 0–1 loss to Víðir.

International career
Diouck is eligible to represent Belgium and Senegal internationally. He has represented Belgium at the U-15, U-16 and U-17 level.

Career statistics

References

External links

Voetbal International profile

1994 births
Living people
Association football forwards
Belgian footballers
Senegalese footballers
Footballers from Dakar
Belgian people of Senegalese descent
Naturalised citizens of Belgium
Belgian expatriate footballers
Senegalese expatriate footballers
Expatriate footballers in the Netherlands
Belgian expatriate sportspeople in the Netherlands
Senegalese expatriate sportspeople in the Netherlands
Expatriate soccer players in Canada
Belgian expatriate sportspeople in Canada
Senegalese expatriate sportspeople in Canada
Expatriate footballers in Iceland
Belgian expatriate sportspeople in Iceland
Senegalese expatriate sportspeople in Iceland
Lierse S.K. players
Beerschot A.C. players
Royal Antwerp F.C. players
Helmond Sport players
Lommel S.K. players
K.V.K. Tienen-Hageland players
FC Edmonton players
Knattspyrnufélag Fjallabyggðar players
Njarðvík FC players
Belgian Pro League players
Challenger Pro League players
Eerste Divisie players
Canadian Premier League players
2. deild karla players
Belgium youth international footballers